Patriotism is the feeling of love, devotion, and sense of attachment to a homeland and alliance with other citizens who share the same sentiment.

Patriotism may also refer to:
 Patriotism (short story), a 1960 short story by Yukio Mishima
 Patriotism (1966 film), a Japanese short film, based on the short story by Yukio Mishima
 Patriotism (1918 film), an American silent drama film

See also
 Patriot (disambiguation)